Eberbach (South Franconian: Ewwerbach) is a town in Germany, in northern Baden-Württemberg, located 33 km east of Heidelberg. It belongs to the Rhein-Neckar-Kreis. Its sister cities are Ephrata, United States and Thonon-les-Bains, France.

Geography

Location 
Eberbach lies at the foot of the Katzenbuckel, at 626 m the highest elevation in the Odenwald, in the Naturpark Neckartal-Odenwald, on the romantic Burgenstraße (Castle Road) along the river Neckar.

Boroughs 
Eberbach includes the boroughs of Neckarwimmersbach, Brombach, Friedrichsdorf, Lindach, Rockenau, Badisch Igelsbach, Gaimühle, Unterdielbach, Badisch Schöllenbach and Pleutersbach.

The border with Hesse runs through the borough of Igelsbach. Therefore, only the northeast half, called Badisch Igelsbach, of the borough belongs to Eberbach. The southwest half, called Hessisch Igelsbach, belongs to the Hessian municipality of Hirschhorn. The same is true for the borough Schöllenbach. The larger part of Schöllenbach belongs to the municipality of Hesseneck.

History 

Eberbach is a former Imperial Free City, founded soon after 1227—when the castle was first mentioned—by German King Henry VII of the House of Hohenstaufen. After his pledge to the Counts Palatine in 1330, the old Free City belonged to the Electorate of the Palatinate. 

In 1803, it passed to the Principality of Leiningen, and since 1806 it has belonged to Baden. Until 1924, it was the seat of the authority office (Bezirksamt). In 1977 the town celebrated its 750-year jubilee.

Main sights 

The historic old town, which is a pedestrian precinct, with its four well maintained towers, many well kept timber-frame houses and some town wall remnants, is a magnet for tourists. Likewise, the Eberbach castle ruins, which stand above the town on one of the mountains in the Odenwald range that surrounds the town, are worthy of sightseeing as part of the string of castles along the river Neckar. Eberbach also lies on the Burgenstraße (Castle Road), which leads from Mannheim all the way to Prague.

The Ohrsberg is a peak in Eberbach. It shapes the town and is 229 m (751 ft) high.

Museums 
Several museums can be found in Eberbach:
Heimatmuseum der Stadt Eberbach — Museum of Local History for the Town of Eberbach
Küfereimuseum — cooperage museum
Zinnfiguren-Kabinett — tin figures

Government

Municipal council
Eberbach town council has 22 members, who are elected every five years. The 2014 election was as follows:

Mayor
The mayor is directly elected for eight years.

Coat of arms 
Description: (source: Archiv der Stadt Eberbach, Dr. Rüdiger Lenz, Archive Head)

Eberbach's coat of arms is heraldically described thus: Argent (white or silver) on lowered fess wavy azure a boar striding sable.   This makes the coat of arms a rebus of the town's name – a "canting" coat of arms – since it shows a boar (Eber in German) and a wavy blue line representing a brook (Bach in German). Eberbach's flag is blue and white (or blue and silver). 

As an Imperial City, Eberbach would have had leave originally to have its arms bear the Imperial eagle. The Imperial eagle was once to be found in the town wall at the upper gate. A photograph taken of it in 1909, along with the armorial stone itself, are today kept in the Town Museum, where they may be seen. The current coat of arms has been established to be from a seal impression dating back to 1387. The boar's appearance, however, in today's arms, adopted in 1976, is clearly unlike the original.

Cultural events 

The following events are held yearly:
Apfeltag (Apple Day) – mid-October
Bärlauchtage (Bear Garlic Days) - mid-March to mid-April celebrate Ramsons
Frühlingsfest (Spring Festival) - mid-May
Kuckucksmarkt (Cuckoo Market): Eberbach's Cuckoo Market is a folk festival on the last weekend of August. The name traces itself back to an old traditional story. According to the tale, an Eberbacher (from the main town north of the Neckar) in an inn in Neckarwimmersbach (on the south bank) was served a cuckoo, rather than the pigeon that he had ordered. This he then proceeded to consume. The Cuckoo Market is held in Neckarwimmersbach at the "In der Au" sports grounds and in several streets (Schwanheimer Straße, Beckstraße, Neckarbrücke). It was once held on the Neckar's north bank between Pulverturm and Grüner Baum, which is nowadays where the aforesaid Spring Festival is held.

Economy and infrastructure

Transport 
The S 1/2 lines of the Rhine-Neckar S-Bahn run half-hourly along the Neckar Valley Railway towards Mosbach and Heidelberg/Mannheim. Moreover, regional express trains shuttle along this same right of way two-hourly bound for Mannheim and Heilbronn. Regional trains also run every two hours along the Odenwaldbahn to Darmstadt and Frankfurt.

Eberbach, unlike most towns of comparable size, maintains its own transport system, the Stadtwerke Eberbach (SWE). The fleet comprises all together 6 buses which weekdays serve the main routes (Ledigsberg and Eberbach/Nord) from 5:10 to 19:30 half-hourly, and lesser routes irregularly. Saturdays the buses run from 6:30 to 14:50. At the Spring Festival and the Cuckoo Market, special services are laid on. In the latter case, the service runs quite late into the evening to accommodate "marketgoers".

The town transport serves the following routes:

801, 807: Railway station – Ledigsberg
802, 802a, 809: Railway station – Eberbach/Nord
803: Railway station – Rockenau
804: Railway station – Igelsbach
805: Railway station – Holdergrund
806: Hirschhorn – Brombach; this line is run by the Heckmann firm on the SWE's behalf.

Furthermore, the Verkehrsverbund Rhein-Neckar (VRN) and Rhein-Main-Verkehrsverbund (RMV) transport systems serve various regional bus routes.

Eberbach also lies on the well-used Bundesstraßen (Federal Highways) B37 and B45.

Established enterprises 
Eberbach is headquarters to the world's biggest gelatin producer, Gelita, the textile machine factory Dilo, the rowboat building yard Empacher and the ticket vending and fare collecting machine manufacturer, Krauth Technology, whose products are sold worldwide. The headquarters of the Neckardraht Group (wire makers) is likewise also found in the town on the Neckar. A site of the contract pharmaceutical manufacturer Catalent Pharma Solutions (formerly known as R. P. Scherer) is also based in Eberbach.

Media 
The Eberbacher Zeitung is a daily newspaper built on groundwork laid out by the Südwest-Presse, an Ulm newspaper.
 The Rhein-Neckar-Zeitung maintains its own local editing in Eberbach and publishes a special Eberbach and area edition (Eberbacher Nachrichten).
The Eberbach-Channel (see link below) is an online information service for Eberbach and area.

Education 
Steigegrundschule
Dr.-Weiß Grund- und Förderschule
Hauptschule Eberbach
Realschule Eberbach
Hohenstaufen-Gymnasium
Gewerbeschule Eberbach

Health services
Hospital of the Gesundheitszentren Rhein Neckar GmbH (GRN) 
 Internal medicine
 Surgery
 Urology
 Anaesthesia
 HNO
 Gynaecology
 Proctology
 Short-term care
 Physiotherapy
 Training for nursing

Notable natives 

 Johann Conrad Beissel (1691-1768), emigrant who founded the Ephrata  monastery in Ephrata, Pennsylvania (USA) 
 Robert Heinrich Wagner (1895-1946), NS functionary, Gauleiter of Baden and "chief of the civil administration" in occupied Alsace, executed for war crimes
 Alfred Wolf (rabbi) (1915-2004), rabbi in Los Angeles
 Eduard Ritsert (1859–1946), chemist, inventor of Benzocaine

International relations

Eberbach (Baden) is twinned with:
  Thonon-les-Bains, France
  Ephrata, United States

References

External links 

  Town's official website
  Eberbach Channel – Online town magazine with current news
  Pleutersbach home page, a borrough of Eberbach
  Rockenau Sports Club home page
 Tourist information for die Burgstrasse, the Castle Road
 

Towns in Baden-Württemberg
1227 establishments in Europe
Populated places in Baden-Württemberg
Populated places on the Neckar basin
Populated riverside places in Germany
Baden